Fredericksburg Historic District may refer to:

Fredericksburg Historic District (Texas), listed on the National Register of Historic Places in Gillespie County, Texas
Fredericksburg Historic District (Virginia), listed on the National Register of Historic Places in Fredericksburg, Virginia